Tae-yeon is a Korean unisex given name. Its meaning differs based on the hanja used to write each syllable of the name.

Hanja
There are 20 hanja with the reading "tae" and 39 hanja with the reading "yeon" on the South Korean government's official list of hanja which may be registered for use in given names. Some ways of writing this name in hanja include:

 (바꿀 태, 고울 연), with hanja meaning "change" and "beautiful"/"kind-hearted"
 (클 태, 고울 연), with hanja meaning "great" and "beautiful"/"kind-hearted"
 (클 태, 거만할 연), with hanja meaning "great" and "proud"
 (클 태, 늘일 연), with hanja meaning "great" and "lengthen"

Some ways of writing the name use hanja for "yeon" that are not on the South Korean government's list of name hanja:
 (클 태, 가냘플 연), with hanja meaning "great" and "thin"
 (클 태, 종대추나무 연), with hanja meaning "great" and a kind of Ziziphus tree

People
People with this name include:
Entertainers
Won Tae-yeon (born 1971), South Korean male film director
Kim Tae-yeon (actress) (born 1976), South Korean actress
Kim Tae-yeon (born 1989), South Korean female singer, member of girl group Girls' Generation

Sportspeople
Ha Tae-yeon (born 1976), South Korean male wrestler
Jin Taiyan (born 1989), Chinese male footballer of Korean descent
Kim Tae-yeon (footballer) (born 1988), South Korean male footballer

Others
Kim Tae-yeon (painter) (born 1986), South Korean female painter

Fictional characters with this name include:
Kim Tae-yeon, female character in 2005 South Korean film Cello
Min Tae-yeon, male character in 2011 South Korean television series Vampire Prosecutor

See also
List of Korean given names
Taeyang (disambiguation)

References

Korean unisex given names